Monchio delle Corti is a comune (municipality) in the Province of Parma in the Italian region Emilia-Romagna, located about  west of Bologna and about  southwest of Parma, including part of the Appennino Parmense.

Sights include the medieval church of Sts. Lawrence and Michael, reconsecrated in 1536.

References

External links
 Official website

Cities and towns in Emilia-Romagna